John Allen Manton (17 August 1807 – 9 September 1864) was an English-born Australian Methodist minister, school principal and founding President of Newington College, Sydney.

Early life
Manton was born in Biggleswade, Bedfordshire. As a teenager he became aware of his vocation and after a trial with the Methodist Society he was made a local preacher before being ordained in 1830. The following year he left for missionary service in New South Wales.

Australian ministry
On his arrival in Australia in 1831, Manton was appointed to Parramatta. He transferred six months later to a penal settlement at Macquarie Harbour, Van Diemen's Land and then to Port Arthur as chaplain. There, he also organized and conducted convict schools for adult convicts and convict boys. From 1834, Manton conducted a successful ministry in Launceston. After several short appointments he was reappointed to Port Arthur, remaining there until Wesleyan chaplains were withdrawn from service. He later served as superintendent minister in Hobart.

Schoolmaster
In 1855 he opened Horton College, Campbell Town, Tasmania, as its first principal. He asked to be relieved of its oversight in 1857 and moved to New South Wales, where he proposed the establishment of a Wesleyan collegiate institution. In 1862 Newington House was leased and, with Manton as President, it was opened in July as Newington College. His health had never been robust and he died at the college in the following year, survived by his widow, Anne, and several children.

References
J. Colwell (ed.), A Century in the Pacific (Sydney, 1914)
D. S. Macmillan, Newington College 1863–1963 (Sydney, 1963)
P. L. Swain, Newington Across the Years 1863–1998 (Sydney, 1999)

1807 births
1864 deaths
Staff of Newington College
Australian Methodist ministers
English Methodist missionaries
Methodist missionaries in Australia
People from Biggleswade
19th-century Methodists